The 2009 Columbia Lions football team was an American football team that represented Columbia University during the 2009 NCAA Division I FCS football season. Columbia tied for fourth in the Ivy League. Columbia averaged 4,027 fans per game.

In their fourth season under head coach Norries Wilson, the Lions compiled a 4–6 record but outscored opponents 225 to 220. Alex Gross, Taylor Joseph, Austin Knowlin, Lou Miller, M.A. Olawale and John Seiler were the team captains.  

The Lions' 3–4 conference record placed them in a tie with Princeton for fourth in the Ivy League standings. Columbia outscored Ivy opponents 151 to 146. 

Columbia played its homes games at Robert K. Kraft Field at Lawrence A. Wien Stadium in Upper Manhattan, in New York City.

Schedule

References

Columbia
Columbia Lions football seasons
Columbia Lions football